Remigius may refer to:

 Saint Remigius of Reims (died 533), who converted Clovis I, king of the Franks
 Remigius of Rouen (755–771), archbishop of Rouen and illegitimate son of Charles Martel
  (died 783)
 Remigius of Lyon, died 875, archbishop
 Remigius of Auxerre, died 908, theologian and teacher
 Remigius de Fécamp, bishop of Lincoln from 1072
 Remigius Isoré, died 1900, priest and martyr

See also
Rémy (name), modern French form of the name

fr:Rémi